7K-F-4 and 7K-F-23 are a pair of archaeological sites in southern Kent County, Delaware, near the town of Milford.  Both are Early Woodland Period Native American camp sites, at which ceramics have been found.

The sites were listed on the National Register of Historic Places in 1982.

See also
National Register of Historic Places listings in Kent County, Delaware

References

Archaeological sites on the National Register of Historic Places in Delaware
Kent County, Delaware
National Register of Historic Places in Kent County, Delaware